Caminetti v. United States, 242 U.S. 470 (1917), was a United States Supreme Court case involving Farley Drew Caminetti and the Mann Act. The Court decided that the Mann Act applied not only to purposes of prostitution but also to other noncommercial consensual sexual liaisons. Thus, consensual extramarital sex falls within the definition of "immoral sex."

Plain meaning rule
The case has an historic place in American jurisprudence in that it was one of the first where the court embraced the idea of the “plain meaning rule”.  This is a form of legislative interpretation that focuses strongly on the literal text of a statute.  In its most extreme form the plain meaning rule does not look outside of the statutory text at any additional sources to find the legislative intent if the rule is "plain" from the text.  Critics of using the plain meaning rule argue that a court may find or not find an ambiguity in a statute depending on the end result that a court sees fit.

The issue in the case that caused the Court to interpret using the plain meaning rule was whether the Mann Act's inclusion of the phrase “...or for any other immoral purpose...” included Caminetti's actions.  The Court found that Caminetti had been convicted of transporting a woman across state lines for an immoral purpose which, according to the majority opinion, was well within the plain meaning of the statute.

See also
List of United States Supreme Court cases, volume 242
United States v. Bitty (1911)
Athanasaw & Sampson v. United States,

Notes

Further reading

External links
 
 

United States Supreme Court cases
United States statutory interpretation case law
1917 in United States case law
Mann Act
Abrogated United States Supreme Court decisions
United States Supreme Court cases of the White Court